The Lanka Premier League (abbreviated as LPL;) is a professional cricket league in Sri Lanka in Twenty20 format contested every year by teams representing Sri Lankan cities from 2020. The league was founded by Sri Lanka Cricket (SLC) in 2018. In August 2020, Ravin Wickramaratne, the Vice President of SLC was officially appointed as the director of the tournament.

History

Background 
Originally, the first season was supposed to be held from 18 August to 10 September 2018, but postponed multiple times due to administrative issues within SLC. In June 2020, amidst the COVID-19 pandemic, SLC announced the tournament would start on 28 August 2020, with 70 overseas players showing interest in playing in the league. After being rescheduled many times due to restrictions for the pandemic, the first season began on 26 November 2020.

2021 onwards
Lanka Premier League second edition dates announced; it will start on 30 July and the final to be played on 22 August 2021.  This was later pushed back to a start date of 19 November 2021.

The third edition was scheduled to take place in August 2022. However, due to the ongoing Sri Lankan economic crisis and the resultant 2022 Sri Lankan protests, the tournament was postponed. Despite the player draft being held, the rights holder of the tournament the Innovative Production Group was unwilling to go ahead with the schedule due to the prevailing economic situation at the time.

Teams

Current teams

Defunct teams

Finances
The inaugural edition of the league reached a cumulative audience of 557 million through TV, digital-social media and traditional media.

Tournament season and results
Out of the five teams that have played in the Lanka Premier League only one team has won the competition twice. Jaffna Stallions became the champion for the inaugural season of Lanka Premier League who defeated Galle Gladiators by 53 runs in the final of the inaugural season. Jaffna Kings beat Galle Gladiators by 23 runs in the final, to win their second successive LPL title.

Season results

Team records

Notes:
 Tie & W and Tie & L indicates the matches tied and then won by or lost by Super over respectively.
 The result percentage excludes no results and counts ties (irrespective of a tiebreaker) as half a win.

Team's performance

Records

Team records

Most runs in an innings

Fewest runs in an innings

Highest match aggregates

Lowest match aggregates

Greatest win margins (by runs)

Narrowest win margins (by runs)

Individual Records (Batting)

Most Career Runs

Highest individual score

Highest individual score against each team

Highest career average

Most 50+ Scores

Most centuries

Most Sixes

Most Sixes in an inning

Most fours

Most fours in an inning

Highest Strike Rates

Highest strike rates in an innings

Most Runs in a Series

Individual Records (Bowling)

Most Wickets

Best Figures in an Inning

Best Figures in an Inning against each team

Best Career Average

Best Career Economy Rate

Best Career Strike Rate

Most Maidens

Most four-wickets (& over) hauls in an innings

Best economy rates in an innings

Best Strike Rates in an innings

Most runs conceded in a match

Most wickets in a season

Individual Records (Wicket-keeping)

Most career dismissals

Most dismissals in an innings

Most Dismissals in a Series

Individual Records (Fielding)

Most Career Catches

Most Catches in an Inning

Most Catches in a Series

Individual Records (Other)

Most Matches

Most Matches as Captain

Most Runs as Captain

Partnership Records

Highest Partnership by wicket

Highest Partnership by Runs

International Broadcasters 

Source: Newswire.lk

LPL Governing Council
The LPL is governed by the Sri Lanka Cricket. Sri Lanka Cricket is responsible for all the functions of the tournament. Members of the governing council include Sri Lanka CEO Ashley de Silva. The marketing and organisation rights of the LPL were awarded by Sri Lanka Cricket on the basis of bidding process. The present rights are held by an Indian-owned Dubai-based company, Innovative Production Group (IPG).

See also
List of Lanka Premier League captains

References

External links

Official Website of LPL

Cricket leagues in Sri Lanka
Professional cricket leagues
Twenty20 cricket leagues